Kurtziella atrostyla, common name the brown-tip mangelia, is a species of sea snail, a marine gastropod mollusk in the family Mangeliidae.

Description
The length of the shell varies between 3 mm and 9 mm.

Distribution
K. atrostyla can be found in the Atlantic Ocean, the Gulf of Mexico and the Caribbean Sea, ranging from the coast of North Carolina south to Quintana Roo.

It has also been as a fossil found in Quaternary strata in Louisiana, USA.

References

 Rosenberg, G., F. Moretzsohn, and E. F. García. 2009. Gastropoda (Mollusca) of the Gulf of Mexico, Pp. 579–699 in Felder, D.L. and D.K. Camp (eds.), Gulf of Mexico–Origins, Waters, and Biota. Biodiversity. Texas A&M Press, College Station, Texas

External links
  Tucker, J.K. 2004 Catalog of recent and fossil turrids (Mollusca: Gastropoda). Zootaxa 682:1–1295.
 

atrostyla
Gastropods described in 1884